The second season of the television series True Blood commenced airing in the United States on June 14, 2009, concluded on September 13, 2009, and contains 12 episodes. 
It is loosely based on the second novel of The Southern Vampire Mysteries, Living Dead in Dallas.

The second season explores telepath Sookie Stackhouse's relationship with her vampire lover, Bill Compton. It also introduces a number of sub-plots involving the anti-vampire Fellowship of the Sun church and Jason Stackhouse's indoctrination into the church by its leaders, Rev Steve Newlin and his wife Sarah. It also expands the role of Maryann Forrester, a powerful supernatural creature, who slowly gains control over the people of Bon Temps. Sookie and Bill travel to Dallas to help Eric find his maker, a two-thousand-year-old vampire named Godric, who has gone missing and is believed to have been kidnapped by the Fellowship of the Sun.

The second season aired Sundays at 9:00 PM in the United States. The season finale aired on September 13, 2009.

Plot
Anna Paquin returns as the main character Sookie Stackhouse, a waitress with telepathic abilities. Stephen Moyer plays her love interest, vampire Bill Compton. At the beginning of the season Eric Northman (Alexander Skarsgård), the Sheriff of Area 5, recruits Sookie and Bill to find his maker, Godric (Allan Hyde). In Dallas, Godric's lieutenants, Stan Davis (Ed Quinn) and Isabel (Valerie Cruz), argue over the direction the vampires should take following Godric's disappearance. Christopher Gartin portrays Isabel's turncoat human boyfriend Hugo, who betrays the Dallas vampires to the Fellowship of the Sun.

Ryan Kwanten returns as Jason Stackhouse, Sookie's brother, who was recruited by the Fellowship of the Sun at the end of the previous season. He travels to Dallas to join the church, and Reverend Steve Newlin (Michael McMillian) and his wife Sarah (Anna Camp) both take a shine to Jason; Steve is impressed by his strength and Sarah is impressed by his looks.

In Bon Temps Sam Merlotte (Sam Trammell), the owner of Merlotte's bar, resolves to leave town but is persuaded to stay when he meets Daphne Landry (Ashley Jones), a fellow shapeshifter and lousy waitress.  Maryann Forrester (Michelle Forbes) reveals herself to be a supernatural being, a maenad. She uses her powers to control the people of Bon Temps, starting with Tara Thornton (Rutina Wesley). "Eggs" Benedict Talley (Mehcad Brooks) becomes closer to Tara, and he kills Daphne while under the influence of Maryann.

Arlene Fowler (Carrie Preston) and Terry Bellefleur (Todd Lowe) also become involved while under the influence of Maryann.

At the beginning of the season, Tara's cousin Lafayette Reynolds (Nelsan Ellis) is imprisoned at Fangtasia with Royce Williams (Caleb Moody). After Royce is killed by Eric, Lafayette attempts to escape and is shot. He is later healed by Eric and ordered by Pam (Kristin Bauer) to resume selling vampire blood.

Jim Parrack returns as Hoyt Fortenberry Jason's co-worker. He meets Jessica Hamby (Deborah Ann Woll) and begins a relationship with her, much to the disgust of his mother, Maxine Fortenberry.

After being wrong about Jason Stackhouse, Andy Bellefleur (Chris Bauer) begins drinking heavily and is stripped of his badge. Despite this, he continues the search for Miss Jeanette's killer, later revealed to be Eggs under Maryann's influence.

In the last two episodes, Evan Rachel Wood is introduced as Sophie-Anne Leclerq, the vampire Queen of Louisiana.

Lettie Mae (Adina Porter) also returns, as does William Sanderson as Sheriff Dearborne.

Episodes

Cast and characters

Main cast

 Anna Paquin as Sookie Stackhouse
 Stephen Moyer as Bill Compton
 Sam Trammell as Sam Merlotte
 Ryan Kwanten as Jason Stackhouse
 Rutina Wesley as Tara Thornton
 Chris Bauer as Detective Andy Bellefleur
 Mehcad Brooks as "Eggs" Benedict Talley
 Anna Camp as Sarah Newlin
 Nelsan Ellis as Lafayette Reynolds
 Michelle Forbes as Maryann Forrester
 Mariana Klaveno as Lorena Krasiki
 Todd Lowe as Terry Bellefleur
 Michael McMillian as Reverend Steve Newlin
 Jim Parrack as Hoyt Fortenberry
 Carrie Preston as Arlene Fowler
 William Sanderson as Sheriff Bud Dearborne
 Alexander Skarsgård as Eric Northman
 Deborah Ann Woll as Jessica Hamby

Guest Cast

 Patricia Bethune as Jane Bodehouse
 John Billingsley as Mike Spencer
 Ashley Jones as Daphne Landry
 Adam Leadbeater as Karl
 Wes Brown as Luke McDonald
 Dale Raoul as Maxine Fortenberry
 Valerie Cruz as Isabel Beaumont
 Kristin Bauer van Straten as Pamela Swynford De Beaufort
 Greg Collins as Gabe
 Chris Coy as Barry Horowitz
 Allan Hyde as Godric
 Tara Buck as Ginger
 Christopher Gartin as Hugo Ayers
 Aisha Hinds as Miss Jeanette
 Valorie Hubbard as Random Frenzier
 Ed Quinn as Stan Davis
 Tanya Wright as Deputy Kenya Jones
 Price Carson as Mean Looking Frenzier
 Patrick Gallagher as Chow
 Alec Gray as Coby Fowler
 Jennifer Hamilton as Dancer #1
 Lindsey Haun as Hadley Hale
 Preston Jones as Dirk
 Jack Krizmanich as Ludis
 Ailsa Marshall as Desk Clerk
 Tess Alexandra Parker as Rosie
 Lauren Pritchard as Coralee
 Jessica Tuck as Nan Flanagan
 Laurel Weber as Lisa Fowler
 Avion Baker as Young Tara
 Jeanne Baron as Hostess
 Michael Bofshever as Orry Dawson
 John Hillard as Hank
 Caleb Moody as Royce Williams
 Judy Prescott as Sue Ann Merlotte
 John Rezig as Deputy Kevin Ellis
 Stephen Root as Eddie Gauthier
 Martin Spanjers as Young Sam
 Sharon Tay as Sharon

Special guest cast

 Adina Porter as Lettie Mae Thornton
 Evan Rachel Wood as Sophie-Anne Leclerq

Production

Crew
Series creator Alan Ball returned as executive producer and head writer. Gregg Fienberg, who worked on HBO's Deadwood, joined Ball as executive producer.

Chris Offutt left the writing staff at the end of the first season and was recruited onto the Showtime dark comedy Weeds. Brian Buckner, Alexander Woo, Nancy Oliver and Raelle Tucker all returned from the first season. Along with Ball, all writers authored two episodes a piece with the exception of Woo, who wrote three including the finale. Script co-ordinator Kate Barnow and writer's assistant Elisabeth R. Finch co-wrote the tenth episode.

Daniel Minahan, Michael Lehmann, Scott Winant and John Dahl returned to direct multiple episodes. Michael Ruscio, the senior editor on the series and long-time collaborator with Ball, made his directorial debut with the seventh episode. Adam Davidson, who directed a fifth-season episode of Six Feet Under shot episode ten while Michael Cuesta, another Six Feet Under alum directed the finale.

Buckner and Oliver were the co-executive producers with Woo serving as supervising producer and Tucker as producer. Christina Jokanovich served as associate producer along with Luis M. Patiño. Bruce Dunn joined as co-producer and Mark McNair joined as producer.

Reception
The second season received a generally more positive reaction than the first. The New York Post acclaimed the violence in the second season: "I'm happy to report that this season, there's More Blood! More Torture! More Killing! and More Intrigue! than last season." 

New York Magazine praised the series: "It's really located at that dirty crossroads HBO discovered long ago, smart enough to be uninsulting, but obsessed enough (and graphic enough about) sex and wildness that it is addictively watchable, not so much a guilty pleasure as a binge food. Cable catnip, in other words." and Newsday described the second season as: "Silly, gross, soapy, mysterious, intriguing, exotic, erotic True Blood is fun. Even more fun this season."

By the end of the second season, True Blood scored 74, indicating favorable reviews, on Metacritic, an aggregator of critical responses, 10 more than the 64 scored by season one.

Accolades

This season was nominated for Outstanding Drama Series at the 62nd Primetime Emmy Awards, but lost to Mad Men. The show was also nominated for a Golden Globe Award for Best Drama Series and Anna Paquin was nominated for Best Actress – Television (Drama). It won Favorite TV Obsession at the People's Choice Awards, which it was also nominated for Favorite Sci-Fi Fantasy Show, Best TV Drama Actress for Anna Paquin, but lost to Supernatural and  Katherine Heigl respectively. It received nine nominations at the Scream Awards for The Ultimate Scream (the highest award), Best TV Show, Best Horror Actress for Anna Paquin, Best Horror Actor for Stephen Moyer and Alexander Skarsgård, Best Supporting Actor for Sam Trammell, Best Breakout Performance – Female for Deborah Ann Woll, Best Ensemble for the entire cast and Most Memorable Mutilation. The series won Best TV Show, Best Actress for Anna Paquin, and Best Actor for Alexander Skarsgård. It was also nominated for Outstanding Performance by an Ensemble in a Drama Series at the Screen Actors Guild Awards, but lost to Mad Men.

Ratings
The second-season premiere of the series on June 14, 2009, was watched by 3.7 million viewers, making it the most watched program on HBO since the series finale of The Sopranos. The total number of viewers for the season premiere, including the late night replay, was 5.1 million.
The tenth episode of the second season (August 23, 2009) was seen by 5.3 million viewers, a new record for the series, with an overall weekly second season average of 11.5 million viewers including repeats.

United Kingdom
All ratings are taken from the UK Ratings website, BARB.

Soundtrack
List of Season 2 Ending Credits Songs in order.
Randy Travis—Nothing but the Blood (of Jesus)
Chuck Prophet—You Did (Bomp Shooby Dooby Bomp)
Debbie Davies—Scratches
Headbone – Dig
Katie Webster – Never Let Me Go
Dolly Kay—Hard-Hearted Hannah (the Vamp from Savannah)
Bad Livers – Death Trip
Beck- Timebomb
Lyle Lovett – I Will Rise Up
Sister Gertrude Morgan & King Britt – New World in My View
Screamin' Jay Hawkins – Frenzy
Bob Dylan – Beyond Here Lies Nothin

The official soundtrack was released on 25 May 2010 in the United States.

References

External links 
 

True Blood
2009 American television seasons